Cyril Edward "Cy" Strange (June 22, 1914 – February 12, 1987) was a Canadian radio broadcaster who was born in Maguire, Ontario.

Strange grew up in the farming community of Maguire, where his father had a general store. As a youth, Strange worked in the family store. He had his first experiences with radio singing and playing guitar at a radio station in London, Ontario.

Strange started his broadcast career in Toronto where he joined CFRB in 1943 as a journalist. Strange moved to the Canadian Broadcasting Corporation in 1946. He served in a variety of roles for CBC radio and television, including as a host of As It Happens from 1971 to 1973, co-host of Fresh Air for several decades, and commentary on  Science Magazine.

References

1914 births
1987 deaths
Canadian talk radio hosts